The South Fourche La Fave River is a stream in the Ouachita Mountains of Perry and Yell counties of Arkansas. It is a tributary of the Fourche La Fave River.

The headwaters arise southwest of the Allen Peak Lookout Tower (at ) and the stream flows east-northeast. It flows under Arkansas Highway 27 just south of Onyx and then parallel to Arkansas Highway 314 past Steve and Hollis. It passes under Arkansas Route 7 and flows north and east to its confluence with the Fourche La Fave River east of Nimrod (at ).

References

Rivers of Arkansas
Rivers of Perry County, Arkansas
Rivers of Yell County, Arkansas
Fourche La Fave River